Rockport is a seaside town in Essex County, Massachusetts, United States. The population was 6,992 in 2020. Rockport borders Gloucester to its west, and is surrounded by the Atlantic Ocean in all other directions.

Part of the town comprises the census-designated place of Rockport.

History

Before the coming of the English explorers and colonists, Cape Ann was home to a number of Native American villages, inhabited by members of the Agawam tribe. Samuel de Champlain named the peninsula "Cap Aux Isles" in 1605, and his expedition may have landed there briefly. The first Europeans founded a permanent settlement at Gloucester in 1623.  

Richard Tarr, a granite cutter and the first settler of the Sandy Bay Colony, lived in the area that is now Rockport in 1680. He and his wife Elizabeth had ten children, those born after 1690 were recorded in the Sandy Bay Colony record books. Richard died around the year 1732. The area provided timber for shipbuilding, especially pine, and granite was extracted from the Sandy Bay quarries. The Cape Ann area provided one of the richest fishing grounds in New England and in 1743 a dock was built at Rockport harbor on Sandy Bay and was used for both timber export and fishing. By the beginning of the 19th century, the first granite quarries were developed and, by the 1830s, Rockport granite was being shipped to cities and towns throughout the east coast of the United States.

Rockport had consisted primarily of large estates, summer homes, and a small fishing village while Gloucester was becoming increasingly urbanized. Rockport was set off as a separate town in 1840 as its residents desired a separate enclave with an identity of its own, and was incorporated in 1840. As the demand for its high-grade granite grew during the Industrial Revolution, the quarries of Rockport became a major source of the stone. A distinctive form of sloop was even developed to transport the granite to parts far and wide until the second decade of the 20th century. For many years, there was a large number of residents of Scandinavian descent, dating from the days when Finnish and Swedish immigrants with stone-working expertise made up a large part of the workforce at the quarries.

Although the demand for granite decreased with the increased use of concrete in construction during the Great Depression, Rockport still thrived as an artists colony—which began years earlier due in part to its popularity as a vacation spot known for its rocky, boulder-strewn ocean beaches, its history as a prominent fishing harbor, and its mentions in media like that of Rudyard Kipling's Captains Courageous. A red fishing shack on Bradley Wharf in Rockport, known popularly as "Motif Number 1", has for years been one of the most famous sites on Cape Ann as the subject of hundreds of paintings and photographs, and is visited by aspiring artists & tourists alike from all over the world.  Rockport is the home of the Rockport Art Association.

In 1856, a gang of 200 women led by Hannah Jumper swept through the town and destroyed anything containing alcohol in what is called "Rockport's revolt against rum" and banned alcohol from the town. Except for a period in the 1930s, the town remained one of 15 Massachusetts dry towns. The town remained dry for many years until 2005, when it was voted that alcohol could be served at restaurants. Sales at stores were not allowed until March 2019, when a local market was granted a liquor license and began to sell beer and wine.

In 1933, the Rockport American Legion Post. No. 98 built a  scale model of "Motif No.1" for the Legion Parade, which was held in Chicago, Illinois, site of the 1933 World's Fair. Designed by Aldro Hibbard and Anthony Thieme, with participation by the RAA, Board of Trade and townspeople "from high to low", the float was commissioned in June, completed by the end of September, and driven in daylight only, from Rockport to Chicago, in less than a week. On October 3, 1933, among 200 floats, it won first place in the historic float competition. Upon the float's return to Rockport, a crowd of over 4,000 people lined up and down the Great Hill (5 corners) to welcome the float home.

The Labor Movement in Rockport Quarries

Rockport, especially the Pigeon Cove area, has historically been home to many immigrant communities, notably Finns, Swedes, Italians, and Portuguese immigrants. Scandinavian immigrants often worked in the quarries, located at what is now Halibut Point State Park.  Mediterranean immigrants arrived in the Early Republic, and the first Finnish and Swedish immigrants in the 1870s.  Finns and Swedes were often lumped together as one group, and as Historian Jonathan Schwartz suggests, “a generalized "Scandinavian" identity for the Swedish and Finnish immigrants, at least in the eyes of the New England community”.  These ethnic divisions were important pieces of working-class identities, and became more important as quarry workers become more involved in labor activism against the Rockport Granite Company, which first opened on February 10, 1865, and dissolved on December 31, 1933.

From March to June 1899, for example, a group of Finnish quarrymen, who were the newest immigrant groups brought in to work in the quarries, went on strike. Originally, Finns were brought to Pigeon Cove and the Rockport Granite quarries to break strikes in the early 1890s, but eventually became one of the most militant groups to fight for worker's rights.  The 1899 strike was supported by the National Granite Cutters Union and the Quarry Workers Union, allegedly due to contract violations.  This strike was particularly heated, with violence and arrests throughout the conflict. The Boston Globe provided many reports of the Finns being particularly strong labor activists, refusing to cut deals and threatening those who tried to go to work during the strikes. The Rockport Granite Company attempted to bring in Italian laborers from Boston to act as strikebreakers in the spring of 1899. These temporary workers were housed in shanties near Blood Ledge quarry at Bay View, about half a mile from the quarry. The Finnish workers had heard about the Italians and attempted to communicate that they were on strike and hoped that the Italians would join their cause.  According to The New York Times, the Italian workers had been brought to the quarry “under false pretenses” and about half of them abandoned work. Those who remained felt threatened and the Rockport Granite Company requested police protection for them.

On May 10, 1899, a number of Finnish strikers were arrested for their labor activism.  On April 20, 1899, a group of two hundred Finns rallied and worked its way to the quarry shanties, armed with clubs and stones, eventually converging on the Italian workers who had taken refuge in the boiler house, even going so far as to pull the shutters off the building. Eventually, the strikers dispersed when one member was shot in the foot. The Italian worker groups were quite frightened of the Finnish strikers, and many of them ended up heading back to Boston after this incident.

On June 8, 1899, a bombing, suspected by police to be the work of strikers or someone invested in the strike, destroyed one of the company buildings inhabited by a John Nelson and six other workers who refused to join the strike. Fortunately, the workers were uninjured.  Three Finns were arrested under suspicion of the crime. They later fled Rockport to avoid trial.

Eventually, the Finns and their fellow strikers would win the right to a nine-hour work day and time-and-a-half for overtime work, and assurances that the company would not discriminate against any of the over 2,000 workers who participated in the strike. During the early years of the twentieth century, quarry workers would strike for other rights with the support of their unions, notably in 1902, 1908, and 1916.  The quarries eventually closed down operations in the Great Depression. Two explanations are possible for the closing of the quarry—the introduction of new building materials such as poured concrete and quarry workers' continued movement for higher wages into the 1920s.  Swedish and Finnish workers continued to work in the quarries until their closure, and have left a distinct mark on the cultural heritage of Rockport.

Modern Rockport

Today Rockport is primarily a suburban residential and tourist town, but it is still home to a number of lobster fishermen and artists. Its rocky beaches and seaside parks are a favorite place for tourists from the Greater Boston Area and Rhode Island among other places.

Geography

Rockport lies at the far eastern end of Cape Ann and is surrounded on three sides by water. There are three islands, Straitsmouth Island, Thacher Island, and Milk Island, which lie off the coast of Rockport and are part of the town. The town's shore is mostly rocky north of Lands End, but is somewhat less so south of there, as three of the town's six beaches are on this 1-1/4-mile stretch of shoreline. Rockport Harbor and Old Harbor, both near the center of town, provide deeper water in which boats may dock, which provides ocean access to the fishing community. The town's highest point is atop Pool Hill, which is surrounded by the town forest. The town's other protected areas include Halibut Point State Park & Reservation, the Thacher Island National Wildlife Refuge, and the Knight Wildlife Reservation on Milk Island, as well as a smaller area just south of Halibut Point run by the Massachusetts Audubon Society.

Rockport's only neighboring town is Gloucester. There are no highways within the town but two state routes, Route 127 and Route 127A, pass through. Route 127 passes from north to south, entering inland from Gloucester, passing over Great Hill before following the sea from Back Harbor to Halibut Point and then back. Route 127A follows the southern coast, looping around Land's End, Gap Head and the downtown area before reaching its northern terminus at Route 127. Bus service in Rockport is provided by the Cape Ann Transportation Authority. Rockport is also the last station on its eponymous branch of the Newburyport/Rockport Line of the MBTA Commuter Rail, providing service along the North Shore to Boston's North Station. The nearest airport is the Beverly Regional Airport, with the nearest national and international service at Boston's Logan International Airport.

Demographics

As of the census of 2000, there were 7,767 people, 3,490 households, and 2,027 families residing in the town. There were 4,202 housing units at an average density of 229.5 persons/km2 (594.5 persons/sq mi). The racial makeup of the town was 97.73% (7,590) White, 0.27% 
(20) African American, 0.22%  (17) Native American, 0.45% (34) Asian, 0.03% (2) Pacific Islander, 0.51% from other races, and 0.79% (69) from two or more races.  1.07% (83) of the population were Hispanic or Latino of any race.

The ancestral breakdown of the residents is as follows: English (23.0%), Irish (20.4%), Italian (15.8%), German (7.1%), Scots (5.7%). The percentage of residents born outside of the United States is 6.3% (3.7% in Europe, 1.1% elsewhere in North America, 1.0% in Asia).

There were 3,490 households, out of which 24.4% had children under the age of 18 living with them, 48.0% were married couples living together, 7.6% have a woman whose husband does not live with her, and 41.9% were non-families. 36.3% of all households were made up of individuals, and 16.6% had someone living alone who was 65 years of age or older.  The average household size was 2.20 and the average family size was 2.93.

In the town, the population was spread out, with 21.3% under the age of 18, 4.4% from 18 to 24, 24.5% from 25 to 44, 29.6% from 45 to 64, and 20.2% who were 65 years of age or older.  The median age was 45 years. For every 100 females, there were 85.3 males.  For every 100 females age 18 and over, there were 79.9 males.

The median income for a household in the town was $50,661, and the median income for a family was $69,263. Males had a median income of $46,131 versus $36,458 for females. The per capita income for the town was $29,294.  3.7% of the population and 2.5% of families were below the poverty line.  Out of the total people living in poverty, 3.0% are under the age of 18 and 3.5% are 65 or older. The median house value in the town is $277,300.

Public safety

The Rockport Fire Department and Rockport Ambulance both serve the community as an on-call volunteer fire department. They are dispatched through the police department and respond to the Central fire station on Broadway or the Pigeon Cove fire station on Granite Street. The waters are patrolled by the Rockport Harbormaster located on T-Wharf, who operate a 24’ Boston Whaler Justice and a 22’ Boston Whaler. The Rockport Police Department, located at 168 Main Street, operates three patrol shifts composed of 18 full-time police officers.

Arts and culture

Places and organizations with artistic or cultural notability include:
 Bearskin Neck, a quaint stretch of old fishermen and lobstermen shacks that have gradually been turned into a tourist attraction of restaurants, shops and galleries.
 Dogtown Common, an abandoned inland settlement on Cape Ann which is now protected in perpetuity.
 Halibut Point Reservation, a nature reserve managed by The Trustees of Reservations and the Massachusetts Department of Conservation and Recreation.
 The Paper House, a house, including furnishings, made of wood and around 100,000 recycled newspapers at 52 Pigeon Hill Street.
 Rockport Art Association; founded in 1921, the RAA is one of the oldest and most active art organizations in the country.
 Thacher's Island, an island off Rockport which has twin lighthouses
 Rockport Music, Shalin Liu Performance Center is a state of the art performing arts facility.

Infrastructure

Transportation
Rockport is served by thirteen weekday commuter trains to Boston as one terminus of the MBTA Newburyport/Rockport Line.

Bus transit throughout the area is provided by the Cape Ann Transportation Authority.

Notable people
Kevin Baker, author
William Rose Benet, poet
Nelson Bragg, percussionist and vocalist for Brian Wilson Band
William Slater Brown, novelist
Paula Cole, Grammy Award-winning singer/songwriter
Otis Cook, painter
Marjorie Flack, children's book author and illustrator
William Francis Gibbs, naval architect
Rick Hautala, author
Bobby Hebb, songwriter and singer
David Robinson, drummer for The Cars and the Modern Lovers
Julian Soshnick, civil rights lawyer
Andrew Stanton, writer and director for Pixar
Vermin Supreme, performance artist and 2012 independent US presidential candidate
Anna Zerilli, football player

Films set or filmed in Rockport
Harbourmaster, 1957–1958 adventure/drama television series, starring Barry Sullivan; set in Lockport
Coma (1978)
I'll Be Home for Christmas (1988)
Mermaids (1990)
The Good Son (1993)
The Next Karate Kid (1994)
The Love Letter (1999)
Stuck on You (2003)
The Proposal (2009; standing in for Sitka, Alaska)
Edge of Darkness (2010)
Manchester by the Sea (2016)
''CODA (2021)

See also

Cape Ann
Edwin Hubbell Chapin
Dogtown, Massachusetts
Halibut Point Reservation
Rockport Art Association
Rockport Music
Seaside resort
Thacher Island
Twin Lights Soda

References

External links

 Town of Rockport official website
 An Account of Rockport in the Nineteenth Century (includes pictures and charts)
 Rockport Chamber of Commerce

 
Populated coastal places in Massachusetts
Populated places established in 1623
1623 establishments in Massachusetts